Beyond the Spectrum: the Creamy Spy Chronicles  is a compilation album by Digable Planets. The album contains remastered songs in addition to previously unavailable songs and remixes. The album contains their 1993 top ten hit "Rebirth of Slick (Cool Like Dat)". Indicating the group's appreciation of jazz history, the album was released by the jazz label Blue Note Records.

Track listing
 Intro 0:33 
 Dedicated 2:45 
 Nickel Bags 3:23 
 Jettin' 4:48 
 Where I'm From 4:46 
 Three Slim's Dynamite 5:04
 Dog It 4:22 
 Rebirth of Slick (Cool Like Dat) 4:21 
 Dial 7 (Axioms of Creamy Spies) 5:21 
 Graffiti 5:25 
 Pacifics 4:36 
 9th Wonder (Blackitolism) 3:56 
 Where I'm From 4:39

References

2005 compilation albums
Digable Planets albums
Blue Note Records compilation albums